Freddie "Fred" Borgman (16 December 1946 – 11 May 1996) was a Dutch politician of the Christian Democratic Appeal. He served as a Member of the House of Representatives between 1978 until 1990 when he became Mayor of Nijkerk, serving from 16 March 1990 until his resignation on 1 December 1994 because of an undescribed illness. Borgman died on 11 May 1996 following a battle with his undescribed illness at the age of 49.

Biography

Early life
Freddie Borgman was born on 16 December 1946 in Aalsmeer in the Netherlands Province of North Holland in a Reformed family, the son of Jan Borgman and Sybranda Jacoba de Vries. After leaving secondary school, he worked at the Aalsmeer Flower Auction from 1966 until 1972 in the company of his father.

Politics
He was a member of the Aalsmeer municipal council, from 1 September 1970 until 1 September 1982. He was an alderman from 3 September 1974 until 1 April 1978 when he became a Member of the House of Representatives on 5 April 1978. He served in the House of Representatives until 16 March 1990, with two short interruptions in 1981 and 1982. He focused on matters of health and life issues and was secretary of the fraction from 1986 until 1990. On 16 March 1990 he became the Mayor of Nijkerk, serving until his resignation.

Family
He married Jacoba "Cobi" Koningen on 26 September 1968 in Aalsmeer, they had one son and two daughters, of which one died young from a traffic accident.

External links
Official

  F. (Fred) Borgman Parlement & Politiek

1946 births
1996 deaths
Aldermen in North Holland
Anti-Revolutionary Party politicians
Christian Democratic Appeal politicians
Dutch civil servants
Mayors in Gelderland
Members of the House of Representatives (Netherlands)
People from Aalsmeer
Reformed Churches Christians from the Netherlands